Lithophane contenta is a species of cutworm or dart moth in the family Noctuidae. It is found in North America.

The MONA or Hodges number for Lithophane contenta is 9901.

References

Further reading

 
 
 

contenta
Articles created by Qbugbot
Moths described in 1880